Whynot Records was a Japanese jazz record label.  Several albums of their discography were also released on India Navigation.

Discography

References

Japanese record labels
Jazz record labels